The Assistant Chief of the Naval Staff (Operations) was a senior British Royal Navy appointment. The post holder was part of the Admiralty Naval Staff and member of the Board of Admiralty from 1945 to 1946 and again from 1966 to 1968,

History
The post was established in October 1945 following re-structuring of responsibilities of the Assistant Chief of Naval Staff of one of his responsibilities. The post holder was a part of the Admiralty Naval Staff and member of the Board of Admiralty. The office holder was responsible for supervising the directors of a number of naval staff divisions originally the Operations Division  until December 1946 when the post was abolished. In 1966 the office was revived until 1968 when it was replaced by the Assistant Chief of the Naval Staff (Operations and Air).

Office holders
Included:
 Rear-Admiral E. Desmond B. McCarthy: October 1945-December 1946
Post in abeyance
 Rear-Admiral Josef C. Bartosik: April 1966-July 1968

References

A